Corinne Benizio ("Shirley", born 1962) and Gilles Benizio ("Dino", born 1957), are a French comic duo known by their stagename Shirley et Dino.

Biographies and debut 
Gilles was born on June 1, 1957 in Villerupt in Meurthe-et-Moselle and Corinne on February 12, 1962 in Dugny, Seine-Saint-Denis.

The couple met at university in 1982, married in 1985, and made their debut the same year with the stage name "Achilles Tonic". In several of their shows, the duo depicted touching stories about unsuccessful naïve clowns.

In 2002 they released a partially autobiographical movie 'Cabaret Paradis'.

In 2009 they have played the Baroque King Arthur (opera) by Henry Purcell, and in 2015 they played Don Quichotte chez la Duchesse, a comic ballet by the French Baroque writer Joseph Bodin de Boismortier.

The Shirley et Dino show 
Corinne and Gilles created the characters "Shirley and Dino" during an improvisation internship with Ariane Mnouchkine in 2002, and their frequent skits on Patrick Sébastien's TV show "Le plus grand Cabaret du Monde" (The Greatest Cabaret Show of the World) made them famous in France. The release of clips from that show on YouTube in 2011 made them famous around the world, with more than 2.5 million views (as of September 2018).

As 'Shirley and Dino' they played magic tricks that don't work or magic tricks that were "mistakenly" revealed, and sang well-known Chanson style songs off-tune, with the wrong words or misinterpreted lyrics in foreign languages. Shirley, dressed in a 1960s style gingham dress would explain what they are about to do, with outbursts of awkward laughter, and standing in a childish silly posture, while Dino, dressed in a white suit, pants a bit too short, and a wig with two curls on his forehead, constantly interrupts her, mocking her and talking to the crowd.

In 2003 they received the Mulier prize for their "Le Duo" show, as the "Best Sketch Show of the year". According to the official website, Their DVD was sold in more than 1 million copies.

Theater

Filmography

Television

References

French comedians
1957 births
1962 births
Living people